In probability, statistics, economics, and actuarial science, the Benini distribution is a continuous probability distribution that is a statistical size distribution often applied to model incomes, severity of claims or losses in actuarial applications, and other economic data.  Its tail behavior decays faster than a power law, but not as fast as an exponential.  This distribution was introduced by Rodolfo Benini in 1905. Somewhat later than Benini's original work, the distribution has been independently discovered or discussed by a number of authors.

Distribution

The Benini distribution  is a three parameter distribution, which has cumulative distribution function (cdf)

where , shape parameters α, β > 0, and σ > 0 is a scale parameter. For parsimony Benini considered only the two parameter model (with α = 0), with cdf

The density of the two-parameter Benini model is

Simulation
A two parameter Benini variable can be generated by the inverse probability transform method. For the two parameter model, the quantile function (inverse cdf) is

Related distributions

 If , then X has a Pareto distribution with 
 If  then    where

Software

The (two parameter) Benini distribution density, probability distribution, quantile function and random number generator is implemented in the VGAM package for R, which also provides maximum likelihood estimation of the shape parameter.

See also
 Conditional probability distribution
 Joint probability distribution
 Quasiprobability distribution
 Empirical probability distribution
 Histogram
 Riemann–Stieltjes integral application to probability theory

References

External links
Benini Distribution at Wolfram Mathematica (definition and plots of pdf)

Continuous distributions